The 1992 NCAA Division I Cross Country Championships were the 54th annual NCAA Men's Division I Cross Country Championship and the 12th annual NCAA Women's Division I Cross Country Championship to determine the team and individual national champions of NCAA Division I men's and women's collegiate cross country running in the United States. In all, four different titles were contested: men's and women's individual and team championships.

Held on November 23, 1992, the combined meet was hosted by Indiana University in Bloomington, Indiana. The distance for the men's race was 10 kilometers (6.21 miles) while the distance for the women's race was 5 kilometers (3.11 miles). 

Both team national championships were retained by their respective defending champions: Arkansas for the men (their sixth overall and third consecutive) and Villanova for the women (their fourth overall and second consecutive). The two individual champions were Bob Kennedy (from Indiana) and Carole Zajac (from Villanova).

Men's title
Distance: 10,000 meters

Men's Team Result (Top 10)

Men's Individual Result (Top 10)

Women's title
Distance: 5,000 meters

Women's Team Result (Top 10)

Women's Individual Result (Top 10)

References
 

NCAA Cross Country Championships
NCAA Division I Cross Country Championships
NCAA Division I Cross Country Championships
NCAA Division I Cross Country Championships
Track and field in Indiana
Bloomington, Indiana
Indiana University